Jacobus Gerardus Maria Alexander ("Lex") Bos (born 22 September 1957 in Tilburg) is a former field hockey goalkeeper from the Netherlands, who was a member of the Dutch National Team that finished sixth in the 1984 Summer Olympics in Los Angeles. He was the stand-in for first choice Pierre Hermans. Bos earned a total number of 37 caps, in the years 1982–1986. He retired from international competition after the 1986 Men's Hockey World Cup in London.

External links
 
 Dutch Hockey Federation

1957 births
Living people
Dutch male field hockey players
Olympic field hockey players of the Netherlands
Field hockey players at the 1984 Summer Olympics
Sportspeople from Tilburg